ʻAbd al-ʻAlī (ALA-LC romanization of ) is a male Muslim given name. It is built from the Arabic words ʻabd and al-ʻAlī, one of the names of God in the Qur'an, which give rise to the Muslim theophoric names. It means "servant of the most High".

Given name
 Abd al-Ali al-Birjandi
 Abd Al-Ali Wadghiri
Abdul Ali Bahari, Kenyan politician
Abdolali Bazargan (born 1943), Iranian politician
Abdolali Changiz (born 1959), Iranian footballer
Abdol-Ali Mirza Farmanfarmaian (1932–1973), Qajar prince
Abdelali Kasbane (born 1962), Moroccan runner
Abdelali Lahrichi (born 1993), Moroccan basketball player
Abdolali Lotfi (1880–1956), Iranian politician and judge
Abdul Ali Malik, Pakistan Army engineer officer (served 1947–1974)
Abdul Ali Mazari (1946–1996), Afghan politician

Middle name
Khan Abdul Ali Khan (1922–1997), Pashtun educationalist

Surname
Humayun Abdulali (1914–2001), Indian ornithologist
Muhammed Abdul Ali (born 1951), Prince of Arcot
Nacim Abdelali (born 1981), French footballer

Fictional characters
 Abdul Ali from Squid Game, portrayed by Korean-based Indian actor Anupam Tripathi

References

Arabic masculine given names
Iranian masculine given names
Pakistani masculine given names
Masculine given names